Berlin Beirut is a 2004 German-Lebanese short film by the Lebanese director Myrna Maakaron.

Cast and characters

Awards
Winner of the BERLIN TODAY AWARD 2004.
Winner of the DISCOVERY CHANNEL FILM PRIZE as BEST GERMAN DOCUMENTARY at the 47th International Leipzig Festival For Documentary And Animated Films
Winner of the BEST DOCUMENTARY in Portugal at the FIKE 2004 - Évora International Short Film Festival
Winner of the BEST SHORT FILM at the Carthage Film Festival 2004
Winner of the BEST PRIZE at the Bayreuther Filmfest "kontrast 2005"
Winner of the BEST BERLIN FILM at Achtung Berlin Film Festival 2005
Winner of the SEDICIORO as BEST SHORT, section documentary at the "2nd Film Festival Forlì City"- Italy 2005
Special Mention at the 7ème Biennale des cinémas arabes à Paris - 2004
Special Mention at the International Short Film Festival Hamburg - 2004

References

External links
 Official Website
 Teaser
 

2004 films
2004 comedy-drama films
German comedy short films
Lebanese short films
2000s Arabic-language films
Lebanese comedy-drama films
German comedy-drama films
2000s German films
German drama short films